Monacanthomyia is a genus of flies in the family Stratiomyidae.

Species
Monacanthomyia annandalei Brunetti, 1912
Monacanthomyia atronitens (Kertész, 1914)
Monacanthomyia becki James, 1948
Monacanthomyia nigrifemur (Meijere, 1914)
Monacanthomyia robertsi James, 1980
Monacanthomyia stigmata James, 1980

References

Stratiomyidae
Brachycera genera
Taxa named by Enrico Adelelmo Brunetti
Diptera of Asia
Diptera of Australasia